Andrew Jackson Turner (September 24, 1832June 10, 1905) was an American politician, newspaper editor, and businessman.   He served 4 years in the Wisconsin State Assembly, representing western Columbia County, and was the 2nd Wisconsin Railroad Commissioner.  In contemporaneous documents, his name was almost always abbreviated as A. J. Turner.  He also sometimes went by the nickname "Jack Turner".

Biography
Born in Schuyler Falls, New York, he moved to Grand Rapids, Michigan, in 1855 and then settled in Portage, Wisconsin, in 1857. He was co-editor of the Portage City Record, which later merged with the Portage Wisconsin State Register. Turner served in the Wisconsin State Assembly as a Republican from 1863 to 1864, and again from 1866 to 1869. He was elected chief clerk of the Wisconsin State Senate during the 1876, 1877, and 1878 terms. He also served as mayor of Portage, Wisconsin, and was the Wisconsin Railroad Commissioner from 1878 to 1882. He wrote pamphlets and articles about the history of Portage and the Republican Party. His son was the educator Frederick Jackson Turner. Turner died in Portage, Wisconsin.

Published works

References

1832 births
1905 deaths
People from Schuyler Falls, New York
People from Portage, Wisconsin
Mayors of places in Wisconsin
Republican Party members of the Wisconsin State Assembly
Employees of the Wisconsin Legislature
Editors of Wisconsin newspapers
Writers from New York (state)
Writers from Wisconsin
19th-century American politicians